The 1995 Italian Open was a tennis tournament played on outdoor clay courts that was part of the ATP Super 9 of the 1995 ATP Tour and of Tier I of the 1995 WTA Tour. Both the men's and the women's events took place at the Foro Italico in Rome, Italy. The women's tournament was played from 8 May through 14 May 1995 while the men's tournament was played from 15 May through 22 May 1995. Thomas Muster and Conchita Martínez won the singles titles.

Finals

Men's singles

 Thomas Muster defeated  Sergi Bruguera 3–6, 7–6(7–5), 6–2, 6–3
 It was Muster's 5th title of the year and the 29th of his career. It was his 2nd Masters title of the year and his 4th overall. It was his 2nd victory at the event after winning in 1990.

Women's singles

 Conchita Martínez defeated  Arantxa Sánchez Vicario 6–3, 6–1
 It was Martínez's 4th title of the year and the 28th of her career. It was her 3rd consecutive win at the event after winning in 1993 and 1994.

Men's doubles

 Cyril Suk /  Daniel Vacek defeated  Jan Apell /  Jonas Björkman 6–3, 6–4
 It was Suk's 2nd title of the year and the 13th of his career. It was Vacek's 2nd title of the year and the 8th of his career.

Women's doubles

 Gigi Fernández /  Natasha Zvereva defeated  Conchita Martínez /  Patricia Tarabini 3–6, 7–6, 6–4
 It was Fernández's 3rd title of the year and the 58th of her career. It was Zvereva's 2nd title of the year and the 57th of her career.

References

External links
 ATP – Tournament profile
 ITF – Tournament details

 
Italian Open
Italian Open
Italian Open (tennis)
Italian Open